Teaghan Hartigan (née Laing; born 27 November 1995) is an Australian rugby league footballer who plays as a  for the New Zealand Warriors in the NRL Women's Premiership and the Burleigh Bears in the QRL Women's Premiership.

Background
Hartigan was born in Campbelltown, New South Wales and played her junior rugby league for the Currumbin Eagles.

Her father, Aseri Laing, played for the Western Suburbs Magpies and Melbourne Storm in the National Rugby League (NRL).

Playing career
In 2019, Hartigan played for the Tweed Heads Seagulls in the Southeast Queensland Division 1 competition.

2020

On 18 September, Hartigan joined the New Zealand Warriors NRL Women's Premiership team.

References

External links
NZ Warriors profile

1995 births
Living people
Australian people of Fijian descent
Australian female rugby league players
Rugby league centres
Rugby league second-rows
Rugby league five-eighths
New Zealand Warriors (NRLW) players